is a Japanese politician and physician who is the secretary-general and vice chair of the Japanese Communist Party. He also serves as a member of the House of Councillors for the party.

Early life 
Akira was born on 6 June 1960 in Setagaya, Tokyo. He attended Ōnoden Elementary School, Shiritsu Daiyon Junior High School, and Komaba High School. He graduated from the Tohoku University School of Medicine in March 1987.

References

External links 
  

1960 births
Living people
Japanese Communist Party politicians
Japanese gastroenterologists
Members of the House of Councillors (Japan)
Tokyo gubernatorial candidates
Tohoku University alumni